Golfer's elbow, or medial epicondylitis, is tendinosis of the medial epicondyle on the inside of the elbow. It is in some ways similar to tennis elbow, which affects the outside at the lateral epicondyle.

The anterior forearm contains several muscles that are involved with flexing the digits of the hand, and flexing and pronating the wrist. The tendons of these muscles come together in a common tendinous sheath, which originates from the medial epicondyle of the humerus at the elbow joint. In response to minor injury, this point of insertion becomes inflamed, causing pain.

Causes

The condition is called golfer's elbow because in making a golf swing this tendon is stressed, especially if a non-overlapping (baseball style) grip is used; however, many people develop the condition without playing golf. It is also sometimes called pitcher's elbow due to the same tendon being stressed by the throwing of objects such as a baseball, but this usage is much less frequent. Other names are climber's elbow and little league elbow: all of the flexors of the fingers and the pronators of the forearm insert at the medial epicondyle of the humerus to include: pronator teres, flexor carpi radialis, flexor carpi ulnaris, flexor digitorum superficialis, and palmaris longus; making this the most common elbow injury for rock climbers, whose sport is grip intensive. The pain is normally caused due to stress on the tendon as a result of the large amount of grip exerted by the digits and torsion of the wrist which is caused by the use and action of the cluster of muscles on the condyle of the ulna. However, more than 90% of cases are not actually from sports-related injuries, but rather from labor-related occupations with forceful repetitive activities (such as construction and plumbing).

Epicondylitis is much more common on the lateral side of the elbow (tennis elbow), rather than the medial side. In most cases, its onset is gradual and symptoms often persist for weeks before a person seeks care. In golfer's elbow, pain at the medial epicondyle is aggravated by resisted wrist flexion and pronation, which is used to aid diagnosis. Tennis elbow is indicated by the presence of lateral epicondylar pain precipitated by resisted wrist extension.

Diagnosis
To diagnose golfer's elbow, clinicians may apply force to the elbow and wrist. If the subject indicates pain or inability to resist on the medial side, golfer's elbow may be present. Visual signs and symptoms are used to assist medical diagnosis.

Radiography, ultrasound and magnetic resonance imaging (MRI) can be used to assess the structural integrity of the different tissues of the elbow and may assist in making a more accurate diagnosis.

Treatment
Non-specific treatments include:
 Non-steroidal anti-inflammatory drugs (NSAIDs): ibuprofen, naproxen or aspirin
 Heat or ice
 A counterforce brace or "elbow strap" to reduce strain at the elbow epicondyle, to limit pain provocation and to protect against further damage.

Before anesthetics and steroids are used, conservative treatment with an occupational therapist may be attempted. Before therapy can commence, treatment such as rest, ice, compression and elevation (R.I.C.E.) will typically be used. This will help to decrease the pain and inflammation; rest will alleviate discomfort because golfer's elbow is an overuse injury. The subject can use a tennis elbow splint for compression. A pad can be placed anteromedially on the proximal forearm. The splint is made in 30–45 degrees of elbow flexion. A daytime elbow pad also may be useful, by limiting additional trauma to the nerve.

Simple analgesic medication has a place, as does more specific treatment with oral anti-inflammatory medications. These will help control pain and any inflammation. A more invasive treatment is the injection into and around the inflamed and tender area of a glucocorticoid (steroid) agent. After causing an initial exacerbation of symptoms lasting 24 to 48 hours, this may produce an improvement of the condition in some five to seven days.

Physical therapy

Therapy includes a variety of exercises for muscle and tendon reconditioning, starting with stretching and gradual strengthening of the flexor-pronator muscles. Strengthening will slowly begin with isometrics and progresses to eccentric exercises helping to extend the range of motion back to where it once was. After the strengthening exercises, it is common for the subject to ice the area.

Surgery

After 6 months if the symptoms do not improve, surgery may be recommended. Surgical debridement or cleaning of the area is one of the most common treatments. The ulnar nerve may also be decompressed surgically. If the appropriate remediation steps are taken – rest, ice, and rehabilitative exercise and stretching – recovery may follow. Few subjects will need to progress to steroid injection, and less than 10% will require surgical intervention. Arthroscopy is not an option for treating golfer's elbow.

See also
 Radial tunnel syndrome
 Repetitive strain injury
 Tennis elbow

References

External links 

Golf terminology
Occupational diseases
Overuse injuries
Soft tissue disorders
Sports injuries